Shahid Mahmood Nadeem (born 1947) is a Pakistani journalist, playwright, screenwriter, theater and television director, and a human rights activist. 

He served as the general manager, program director, and deputy managing director of the Pakistan Television Corporation. He is currently director of the Ajoka Theater and director of the PTV Academy.

Early life
Shahid Nadeem was born to a Muslim family in 1947, during the partitioning of British India, in Sopore, Kashmir, to a well-known doctor; the family later settled in Lahore, Punjab.

Career
Nadeem began his career as a human rights and social activist in Lahore. During the era of Muhammad Zia-ul-Haq, he was imprisoned three times in 1969, 1970, and in 1979 for his political activism. In 1980, he was forced to go abroad and moved to London where he worked for Amnesty International between 1980 and 1988, from 1991 to 1993 in Hong Kong, and then in Los Angeles.

Nadeem has directed and written plays for the theater as well as a number of TV series, most of them for PTV. The majority of his plays are written in Urdu and Punjabi. He has adapted a few English plays. Nadeem writes for newspapers, among them The Express Tribune.

In 1995, Nadeem directed and wrote two television serials for the Pakistan Television Corporation including Neelay Hath. One of them is the political drama Zard Dopehar which aired on PTV and starred Shujaat Hashmi and Samina Peerzada. The story centres around a corrupt politician who grew up in a typical middle-class family.

The other, Uraan, aired in the same year on PTV and was very popular. It focused on the culture and management at Pakistan International Airlines (PIA). It was shot mostly at the Jinnah International Airport, Karachi, but some of it was filmed in Kathmandu, London, Nairobi, New York City, and Paris. Shakeel played the lead as a PIA aircraft captain and Faryal Gohar as a senior flight purser.

Nadeem wrote a hit comedy television series Janjaal Pura for PTV during the 2000s. The serial was directed by Tariq Jamil and starred Savera Nadeem, Mehmood Aslam and Naseem Vicky.

On 23 August 2008, the Alhamra Arts Council hosted the launch of Selected Plays published by Oxford University Press (OUP) with the help of Ajoka. The book contains seven of his famous plays: Teesri Dastak, Barri, Aik Thi Nani, Kala Meda Bhes, Dukhini, Bulha and Burqavaganza. The book was also launched at the Pakistan National Council of the Arts (PNCA), Islamabad on 25 August 2008 with the help of the Pakistan Academy of Letters. Two collections of his Urdu and Punjabi plays have been published.

In 2012 Nadeem wrote a play Kaun Hai Yeh Gustakh, directed by Madeeha Gauhar, which was first performed at the Alhamra Arts Council in Lahore on 14 December 2012 by the Ajoka Theater group. The play is based on the life of Saadat Hassan Manto and was well received by audiences. Manto was played by Naseem Abbas. In January 2013 the play was presented at the Akshara Theatre in New Delhi, India. It was due to be presented at the National School of Drama (NSD) in New Delhi but was cancelled due to security concerns. In February 2013, Kaun Hai Yeh Gustakh was performed at Nishtar Hall, Peshawar by Ajoka.

In 2013, Nadeem started writing the script for the television serial Main Manto based on the life of Saadat Hasan Manto. The series is directed by Sarmad Sultan Khoosat, with Sarmad Khoosat playing the lead; he is supported by Mahira Khan and Saba Qamar. The film screened all over Pakistan to critical acclaim.

Personal life
Nadeem has a daughter, Savera Nadeem, from his first marriage who is a television actress. Later Nadeem married Madeeha Gauhar and has two sons, Sarang and Nirvaan, the latter being a TV, film and theatre actor/director, who has also written columns for The Nation. Nadeem and Gauhar first met in London when Shahid was working at Amnesty International and Gauhar was on a study scholarship from the British Council.

Books
Selected Plays. Oxford: Oxford University Press, 2008 .

Filmography

Films

Plays

Television

Awards and nominations

References

Pakistani male journalists
Pakistani dramatists and playwrights
Pakistani screenwriters
Pakistani television writers
Pakistani theatre directors
Pakistani television directors
Pakistani human rights activists
Punjabi people
1947 births
Writers from Lahore
Journalists from Lahore
Pakistani prisoners and detainees
Living people
Recipients of the Pride of Performance
Pakistani people of Kashmiri descent
Male television writers